Obama is a surname. It most commonly refers to Barack Obama (born 1961), the 44th President of the United States.

Origins
Obama is a common Fang surname in western Central Africa.
Obama is a common Luo surname. The Luo word Obam means "to lean or bend".
Obama (小浜 or 小濱) is a Japanese surname literally meaning "little beach"

Notable people with this surname
Barack Obama, 44th president of the United States
Family of Barack Obama, an extended family of American and Kenyan heritage, including:
Michelle Obama (born 1964), wife of Barack Obama, and Vice President for Community and External Affairs for the University of Chicago Hospitals
Barack Obama Sr. (1936–1982), Kenyan economist and father to Barack Obama
Sarah Onyango Obama (1922–2021), also known as Sarah Ogwei, Kenyan educator and philanthropist, the third wife of Barack Obama's paternal grandfather
Auma Obama (born 1960), paternal half-sister of Barack Obama
Malik Obama (born 1958), paternal half-brother of Barack Obama
Pets:
Bo (dog) (2008–2021), a pet dog of the Obama family
Sunny (dog) (born 2012), a pet dog of the Obama family
Florent Obama (born 1991), a Cameroonian footballer
Francisco Pascual Obama Asue, Equatoguinean prime minister since 2016
Jōkō Obama (小浜浄鉱, 1886–1948), a Japanese bureaucrat and politician
Natsuki Obama (小濱なつき, born 1984), a Japanese fashion model and actor
Ricardo Mangue Obama Nfubea (born 1961), Equatoguinean prime minister 2006–08
Youssef Obama (born 1994), an Egyptian footballer

See also
Obama (disambiguation)
Ohama (disambiguation)
Kohama (disambiguation)

References

Barack Obama